Wrecked: Life in the Crash Lane is an American television series that airs on Speed TV. It is a documentary about the daily lives of tow truck operators that work for the O'Hare Towing Service in Chicago, Illinois. The series premiered on July 17, 2008 and as of September 13, 2009, 40 episodes have been broadcast spanning 2 seasons. 

The first and second seasons have consisted of 20 episodes each.

Series overview

Season 1: 2008
Season one aired between July 17, 2008 and November 27, 2009.
"Series #" refers to the episode number in relation to the entire series, while "Episode #" refers to the episode number in the season.

Season 2: 2009
Season two aired between May 21, 2009 and September 10, 2009. "Series #" refers to the episode number in relation to the entire series, while "Episode #" refers to the episode number in the season.

References

Wrecked: Life in the Crash Lane